The Marshall Conferences were a series of three meetings by Confederate leaders at Marshall, Texas, the capital of the exiled Confederate government of Missouri, at the suggestion of Confederate President Jefferson Davis.

First conference
The first conference took place in June 1862, and was between Texas governor Francis R. Lubbock and Confederate Missouri governor Claiborne F. Jackson. The two governors produced three recommendations for Jefferson that were later endorsed by the governors of Arkansas and Louisiana, who did not attend the meeting. The recommendations were as follows: establish a branch of the Confederate treasury located west of the Mississippi River, appoint a general with commanding jurisdiction over the Trans-Mississippi states, and establish more ammunition depots in the region to alleviate an arms shortage.

Second conference
The second conference taking place in August 1863, brought in leaders from Arkansas, Confederate Indian Territory, Louisiana, Confederate Missouri, and Texas.

Third conference
The third and final conference took place in May 1865 and produced unrealistic terms of surrender which the Union rejected.

Political history of the Confederate States of America
Texas in the American Civil War
Missouri in the American Civil War
Marshall, Texas
Arkansas in the American Civil War
Louisiana in the American Civil War
Indian Territory in the American Civil War
1862 in the Confederate States of America
1862 in Texas
1863 in Texas
1865 in Texas
1862 conferences
1863 conferences
1865 conferences